Jose Carranza (born January 18, 1999) is an American soccer player for Liga Nacional club Xinabajul.

Career

Youth and amateur
Carranza played for Northern Virginia SC before joining the D.C. United Academy in 2013. He played at different levels in the D.C. United Academy from 2013 to 2016.

On March 24, 2017, he signed an amateur contract with North American Soccer League side North Carolina FC.

Professional
Carranza signed his first professional contract with North Carolina FC on August 1, 2017.

Carranza signed with Atlanta United 2 for the first half of the 2018 season.

On August 20, 2018, Carranza joined USL side Louisville City FC as a free agent.

International career
In 2014 Carranza joined the U.S. Soccer U-17 Residency Program. In October 2017 he was called up for the U-18 Men’s National Team camp in Spain.

Honors

Club
Louisville City FC
USL Cup (1): 2018

References

External links

1999 births
Living people
American soccer players
Association football midfielders
Atlanta United 2 players
Louisville City FC players
North American Soccer League players
North Carolina FC players
People from Manassas, Virginia
Soccer players from Virginia
USL Championship players